Catunaregam spinosa, the mountain pomegranate, is a flowering plant in the family Rubiaceae, found in South Asia and other Asian countries. Almost all parts of the plant are used as a traditional medicine in Ayurveda and fruits have been
reported to be used in medicine as well as in food. Various flavonoids, alkaloids, tannins, lignans, terpenoids, and volatile oils have been reported from this plant. Several studies have reported the modern pharmaceutical activities of C. spinosa such as piscicidal, molluscicidal, antioxidant, anti-inflammatory, antidiabetic, and antihyperlipidemic activities

Culture
Known as "කුකුරුමාන් - kukuruman" in Sinhala,"karai"(காரை) in Tamil and "Madanphal or Mainphal" in Nepali.
Known as "Manga/Manga Tree"(మంగ/మంగచెట్టు and పిండీతకము) in Telugu speaking regions of Andhra Pradesh and Telangana. మంగ used to be a commonly held first name for many women in this region. There were films like Mangamma Sapatham, Mangamma gari Manavaraalu, Mangamma gaari manavadu, ganga manga, and many local plays with the name మంగ given to the female protagonist.
Known as "गेळफळ"- gelphal or "पहील्या दिवशीचे फळ" translate as "first days flower"  (as it appears white at first) and  next day when it turns yellow it called "second days flower" (दुसर्या दिवशीचे फळ) in Marathi.
The Lepcha of Sikkim call it .

References

External links

 

Gardenieae
Flora of tropical Asia